A four-part referendum on alcohol was held in the Faroe Islands on 6 November 1907. Voters were asked whether they approved of the trading and serving of beer, wine and spirits. All four proposals were rejected by voters. Following the referendum, prohibition was introduced in 1908 on all beverages with an alcohol content above 2%. An attempt in 1973 to overturn this ban was rejected in another referendum, but it was eventually lifted in 1992.

Background
In 1907 the Løgting voted to hold a consultative referendum on banning alcohol. All men and women over the age of 25 were entitled to vote, the first time women had been able to do so.

Results

References

1907 referendums
1907 in the Faroe Islands
1907
Prohibition referendums
November 1907 events